The Order of Danica Hrvatska (lit. "Order of the Croatian Morning Star") is the fourteenth most important medal given by the Republic of Croatia. The order was founded on 1 April 1995. The medal is awarded for different purposes and with different faces:
 Marko Marulić – for culture
 Blaž Lorković – for business/economics
 Ruđer Bošković – for sciences
 Nikola Tesla – for innovation
 Franjo Bučar – for sports
 Katarina Zrinska – for health, social welfare and the promotion of moral values
 Antun Radić – for education

(left: Order medal; middle: smaller decorative version; right: Order ribbon)

Notable recipients 

 John Malkovich
 Mate Rimac
 Michael York OBE
 Martin Sheen
 Andrzej Wajda
 Vladimir Prelog ForMemRS
 Krzysztof Penderecki
 Alain Finkielkraut
 Francesca Thyssen-Bornemisza
 Philip J. Cohen
 Ivo Pogorelić
 Vera Fischer
 Davor Šuker
 Dražen Petrović
 Swami Maheshwarananda
 Bonaventura Duda

 Božo Biškupić

References 

Orders, decorations, and medals of Croatia
Awards established in 1995
1995 establishments in Croatia